The Ukraine Defense Contact Group (also known as the Ramstein group) is an alliance of 54 countries (all 30 member states of NATO and 24 other countries) supporting the defence of Ukraine by sending military equipment, in response to the 2022 Russian invasion. The group coordinates the ongoing donation of military aid at monthly meetings. A first meeting took place between 41 countries on 26 April 2022, and the coalition comprised 54 countries at the latest meeting on 14 February 2023. The meetings were held either at the Ramstein Air Base, NATO headquarters or virtually.

At the 20 January 2023 meeting at Ramstein Air Base, the alliance supported sending heavy offensive weaponry to Ukraine, in support of a planned spring offensive. The possible transfer of German made Leopard 2 main battle tanks from Poland was a sticking point at the January 2023 meeting and in bilateral discussions following this. Germany continued to delay Leopard tank exports until 25 January 2023 when it announced it would provide 14 of its own Leopard 2A6 tanks in tandem with the United States providing 31 M1 Abrams tanks. By 25 February, 71 Leopard 2 tanks had been formally committed for delivery to Ukraine from Germany (18), Portugal (3), Sweden (10), Poland (14), Spain (10), Norway (8), and Canada (8); the first four arrived in Ukraine on 24 February. Additionally, a joint German-Danish-Dutch initiative was announced on 07 February to supply 100-178 Leopard 1A5 tanks from FFG and Rheinmetall stocks.

At the 14 February conference, the main topic of discussion was the transfer of modern fighter jets to Ukraine.

Meetings

Members and Partners

The following is a list of nations/organizations confirmed to have had a representative attend at least one Contact Group meeting:

The following countries' participation in the Ukraine Defense Contact Group are not publicly confirmed, though they are confirmed to have provided military aid (lethal and non-lethal) to Ukraine:
 (provided mortars and aerial bombs)
 (provides de-mining training)
 (provides de-mining training)
 (provided anti-drone systems, counter-drone intelligence, and non-lethal aid such as helmets, flak jackets, etc.)
 (provided 20 T-72 tanks)
 (provided artillery shells, rockets, and other ammunition)
 (provided 120mm mortar bombs and additional undeclared aid)
 (provided unmanned aerial vehicles)

See also
2022 Ramstein Air Base meeting
European Union Military Assistance Mission in support of Ukraine
Operation Interflex
Operation Unifier

References

Political conferences
Reactions to the 2022 Russian invasion of Ukraine
21st century in Rhineland-Palatinate
Diplomatic conferences in Germany
Germany–Ukraine relations
Ukraine–NATO relations